Nonthaburi is the principal city of the district and province of the same name in Thailand.

On 15 February 1936, Nonthaburi town municipality (thesaban mueang) was established, which only covered Suan Yai subdistrict (tambon), just .
As of 31 December 2019, it has a registered population of 254,375, making it the most populous city municipality in Thailand (excluding Bangkok). There are 93 communities (chumchon), although not directly chosen by the local citizens, which provides advice and recommendations to local administrative organizations. Due to its proximity to Bangkok, the city is considered a suburb of Bangkok, a part of the Bangkok Metropolitan Region, or Greater Bangkok.

Nonthaburi is served by public transport systems including the Bangkok Mass Transit Authority bus system, the Chao Phraya Express Boat, and the MRT Purple Line, inaugurated in 2016.

Nonthaburi is known for its temple and market such as Wat Chaloem Phra Kiat, Wat Chomphuwek, Wat Chotikaram, Wat Khema Phirataram, Wat Prasat, Wat Sangkhathan and so on.

Koh Kret (Pak Kret district) 

Koh Kret is a small island located in Chao Phraya River in the province of Nonthaburi, and is some two-kilometre long and one-kilometre wide. In 1722, during the reign of King Thaisa of Ayutthaya, the island was called Khlong Lat Kret Noi which means a shortcut to Kret canal. Later, the current diverted, making the canal larger and turning the cape there into an island. Koh Kret has prospered since the Ayutthaya period as evident from the many temples on the island that are from that period. However, it may have been deserted when the Burmese sacked Ayutthaya. When Ayutthaya was reclaimed, King Taksin the Great relocated the Mon people who found religion here. The Mon people on the island came during the Thon Buri period and during the reign of King Rama II.

References

External links

Populated places in Nonthaburi province
Populated places on the Chao Phraya River